Queen Eleanor & Buccleuch Ward, representing the villages of Cranford, Geddington, Grafton Underwood, Little Oakley, Newton,  Warkton and Weekley, is a 1-member ward within Kettering Borough Council.

The current councillor is Cllr Mark Rowley.

Councillors
Kettering Borough Council Elections 2007
Jonathan Bullock (Conservative)

Current Ward Boundaries (2007-)

Kettering Borough Council Elections 2007
Note: due to boundary changes, vote changes listed below are based on notional results.

See also
Kettering
Kettering Borough Council

Electoral wards in Kettering